Maaroufi is a surname. Notable people with the surname include:

Abdallah El Maaroufi (1944–2011), Moroccan diplomat 
Ibrahim Maaroufi (born 1989), Moroccan footballer
Tarek Maaroufi, Tunisian terrorist

See also
Mohammed Mahroufi (born 1947), Moroccan footballer

Surnames of Moroccan origin